Praise to the Man is a religious album released by the Mormon Tabernacle Choir. This album honors and gives tribute to Joseph Smith.

Track listing
 The Morning Breaks
 Praise to the Man
 Joseph Smith's First Prayer
 Now We'll Sing with One Accord
 This is My Beloved Son
 I Saw a Mighty Angel Fly
 An Angel From on High
 Adam-ondi-Ahman
 On a Golden Springtime
 Come, Listen to a Prophet's Voice
 A Poor Wayfaring Man of Grief
 We Thank Thee, O God, For a Prophet

Charts

References

2009 albums
Religious music albums
Tabernacle Choir albums